John Meillon,  (1 May 1934 – 11 August 1989), was an Australian character actor known for dramatic as well as comedy roles. He portrayed Walter Reilly in the films Crocodile Dundee and Crocodile Dundee II. He also voiced advertisements for Victoria Bitter beer. He appeared in several Australian New Wave films including Wake in Fright and The Cars That Ate Paris.

Biography
Meillon was born in Mosman, New South Wales. His younger brother was director Bob Meillon (1943–2012).

Meillon began his acting career at the age of eleven in the ABC's radio serial Stumpy, and made his first stage appearance the following year. He joined the Shakespeare Touring Company when he was sixteen.

He appeared in a number of early Australian TV plays.

Like many actors of his generation from 1959 to 1965, he worked in England, but while working in Britain he consciously steered away from Australian roles. Meillon claimed that he learnt discipline while working in theatre, and that television was not a good medium for training.

Meillon had a recurring role in the television series My Name's McGooley, What's Yours?. In 1968 he featured in the spin off, Rita and Wally. He featured in two episodes of Skippy in 1968 and 1969, appearing as "Nimble Norris". In 1976, he won the AACTA Award for Best Actor in a Leading Role for his role of 'Casey' in the film The Fourth Wish (1976).

With his rich baritone, Meillon was used extensively in voice-over work— most famously in his work as the Victoria Bitter narrator who says "you can get it any old how".

Meillon married Australian actress June Salter in 1958 and they had one son, John Meillon, Jr. Meillon and Salter were divorced in 1971. Meillon married actress Bunny Gibson on 5 April 1972; they also had a son.

In 1977, Meillon released the single "Tap Tap"/"Picture Show Man", which peaked at number 80 on the Australian singles chart.

Meillon was appointed an OBE in the 1979 Queen's Birthday Honours, for service to theatre.

In June 1980, Meillon's favourite pub, The Oaks at Neutral Bay, opened The John Meillon OBE Bar in his honour. He continued to frequent the bar over the following decade, including visiting in the week before his death from cirrhosis. His body was found in his home at Neutral Bay on 11 August 1989. Meillon was posthumously awarded the Raymond Longford Lifetime Achievement Award.

Selected filmography

 1959: On the Beach .... Ralph Swain (ashore in San Francisco)
 1960: The Sundowners .... Bluey Brown
 1961: The Long and the Short and the Tall .... Private "Smudge" Smith
 1961: Watch It, Sailor! .... Albert Tufnell
 1961: Offbeat .... Johnny Remick
 1962: The Valiant .... Bedford
 1962: Operation Snatch .... Medical Officer
 1962: Billy Budd .... Neil Kincaid
 1962: The Longest Day .... RAdm. Alan G. Kirk (uncredited)
 1962: Edgar Wallace Mysteries episode: Death Trap .... Ross Williams
 1963: Cairo .... Willy
 1963: The Running Man .... Jim Jerome
 1964: 633 Squadron .... Flight Lt. Gillibrand
 1964: Guns at Batasi .... Sergeant 'Aussie' Drake
 1965: Dead Man's Chest .... Johnnie Gordon
 1965: Out of the Unknown (Episode: "Sucker Bait") .... Dr. Sheffield
 1966: They're a Weird Mob .... Dennis
 1966-1968: My Name's McGooley, What's Yours? (TV series) .... Wally Stiller
 1969-1970: Skippy (TV series) .... Nimble Norris
 1971: Wake in Fright .... Charlie aka Outback
 1971: Walkabout .... Man (the father)
 1972: Lane End (TV series) .... Ray Dunlop
 1972: Sunstruck .... Mick Cassidy
 1974: The Fourth Wish (TV miniseries) .... James Casey
 1974: The Dove .... Tim
 1974: The Cars That Ate Paris .... The Mayor
 1975: Sidecar Racers .... Ocker
 1975: Inn of the Damned .... George Parr
 1975: Ride a Wild Pony .... Charles Quayle
 1976: Arena (TV miniseries) .... Bernie Gold
 1976: The Fourth Wish .... Casey
 1977: The Picture Show Man .... Maurice 'Pop' Pym
 1978: Bit Part (TV film) .... Tommy
 1982: Heatwave .... Freddie Dwyer
 1983: Scales of Justice (TV miniseries) .... Barnes
 1983: The Dismissal (TV miniseries) .... Sir John Kerr
 1983: The Wild Duck .... Old Ackland
 1984: The Camel Boy .... Voice
 1985: The Dunera Boys (TV miniseries) .... Brig. Templeton
 1986: Crocodile Dundee .... Walter Reilly
 1987: Bullseye .... Merritt
 1987: Frenchman's Farm .... Bill Dolan
 1988: The Everlasting Secret Family .... The Judge
 1988: Crocodile Dundee II .... Walter Reilly

Discography

Singles

References

External links
 .
 John Meillon profile, AusStage.edu.au; accessed 27 December 2015.
 John Meillon profile, National Film and Sound Archive; accessed 27 December 2015.

1934 births
1989 deaths
20th-century Australian male actors
Australian male film actors
Australian radio personalities
Australian male radio actors
Australian male television actors
Australian Officers of the Order of the British Empire
Best Actor AACTA Award winners
Logie Award winners
Actresses from Sydney